Gurab Zarmikh (also Romanized as Gūrāb Zarmīkh; also known as Gūrāb Zarmakh, Gūrāb Zarmanj, and Kurab-Zermakh) is a city and capital of Mirza Kuchek Janghli District, in Sowme'eh Sara County, Gilan Province, Iran.  At the 2006 census, its population was 4,183, in 1,097 families.

References

Populated places in Sowme'eh Sara County

Cities in Gilan Province
Populated places on the Caspian Sea